Army Daze is a 1996 Singaporean comedy film based on the 1987 theatre play of the same name by Singaporean writer Michael Chiang. Distributed by Cathay Asia Films and directed by Ong Keng Sen, the film portrays a group of 18-year-old Singaporeans from different classes and cultural backgrounds as they perform their National Service and their experience within the Singapore Armed Forces. The movie is spoken in Singlish, Standard English, Malay, Hokkien and Mandarin.

The tagline of the movie, From Real Blur (Singlish reference to a mental state of confusion) to Real Men.

Plot

The film shows six men of different backgrounds enlisting in their National Service. Malcolm; a nerd and "mother's boy", Johari; a large, laid-back hipster Malay man, Krishna; a heroic and loving Indian lover, Ah Beng; a gangster-like delinquent, and Kenny; the effeminate boy who is into women's lifestyle are all introduced as they make their way reporting to the manpower base before assigned to their camp. Malcolm serves as the narrator, the army life is seen through his eyes and thoughts. All six men are placed in Hotel Company Platoon 4, alongside various other males.

Prior to enlisting, Malcolm is seen interacting with a shady Mr. X at the manpower base who sells him a guidebook teaching ways of playing truant in the army while Krishna makes a heart to heart final talk with Lathi, his girlfriend. When Platoon 4 is brought to their bunks after bidding farewell to their loved ones, the six men share their thoughts on the current state of affairs, before being introduced to their drill instructor, Corporal (CPL) Ong, who is a tough-as-nails stereotyped army man. He dramatically tells them all about their upcoming life, then leads them all to their mandatory haircut. At night, the six men introduce themselves to one another, with Malcolm finding himself out of the league almost immediately.

Training goes on with morning physical training, and soon comes the standard obstacle course. The six are shown trying hard but failing, albeit comically, to get through the various itineraries. The recruits are next shown to learn about camouflage, and again unfortunately, they comically fail, upsetting CPL Ong, who tries his best previously to appease his superior, Captain (CPT) Lim.

Soon comes the day relatives and family are allowed to visit the recruits at their camp. Krishna reunites with his lover Lathi dramatically, Ah Beng has his sister Ah Huay outlandishly showing up and Malcolm meets his mother, although she is sickened by the army training her son is put through and demanded to complain. Johari feels his parents aren't coming due to potential weddings to attend, and Kenny dismisses his parents as absent due to holiday. Nevertheless, all six gather for a picture at the moment with Ah Huay photographing.

During combat training, the platoon is introduced to an unsurprising instructor; Sergeant (SGT) Wendy Chung. She is tougher than expected, but Ah Beng unwittingly falls for her. Field camp is next. While the six are assigned to bunk with each other under tents, Kenny and Malcolm try to turn their campsite homely which enrages their platoon sergeant, SGT Monteiro. He punishes both to guard duty, and it turns out Krishna is down for it as well since he attempted to feign a reason for absence but is caught (he is revealed to have bought the same book as Malcolm did and tried its contents). Unfortunately, at nightfall during duty, Krishna faints from shock after getting into a scuffle with a python, and Malcolm discovers him. In lieu of this, Second Lieutenant (2LT) Collin Heng decides to pay a visit to Krishna's immediate family alongside CPL Ong and Malcolm, whom he feels they need to meet. With Krishna's parents overseas, Lathi breaks down upon hearing the news but is comforted by 2LT Heng, who inadvertently informally introduces himself, making Lathi enticed by him. Malcolm however notices this.

After discharged from the medical center, Krishna returns to his bunk to find it empty, only to realise the entire platoon is given off for outstanding performance. The six surprise greet him, but it goes sour after Kenny tried disclosing that Lathi was flirting with 2LT Heng and he claims it was all seen by Malcolm who vehemently denies saying it is so. Krishna is shocked, demanding for the truth from Malcolm who neither affirms it. Kenny continues to go on a tirade before getting snapped back by Johari who had enough of his antics. Kenny angrily storms off, revealing he was left behind by his parents to serve his NS while they left for Australia without him. Johari and Malcolm go out to pacify him, with Krishna crestfallen before Ah Beng who too tries to do the same. Krishna nearly thinks of breaking up with Lathi but is chided by Ah Beng for being shallow given the circumstances, and Kenny pours out to Malcolm and Johari the undesirable truth his parents said to him about serving his time in the army, to which in fact they are right he needed to be who he is and man up.

In a phonecall, Krishna and Lathi manage to reconcile, while Malcolm finally manages to refuse requests from his overprotective mother. The six men bond together as their final days of military training is ending, with each speaking out their desired vocations and the respective responses from one another. The training finally ends with a route march where everyone completes successfully.

Graduating from military training, the families of the six come to pick them up and they all share the efforts and camaraderie they have, now bonded not just as soldiers but like brothers. SGT Wendy Chung then introduces star Deanna Yusoff, whom Johari is previously known to be a big fan of. He is stunned by her appearance as he often dreamed of being with her and they share a final picture with everyone.

In the end, Malcolm signs on with the army and is a Captain while remaining faithful to his nerdy hobbies, Krishna becomes a lawyer and together with Lathi who becomes famous start a family, Johari joins the media industry and finally gets to work with Deanna, Kenny goes into boutique sales and dreams to become a dance choreographer for big events, and Ah Beng who went onto become a cellphone manager and striking lottery which he buys a diamond ring for SGT Wendy Chung.

Cast
 Edward Yong Ching Tah as Malcolm Png, a young naïve Chinese boy from a middle-upper-class background. Due to being doted on by his mother, he at first has difficulty and culture shock in getting used to his new environment but slowly enjoys life in the army. He serves as the narrator of the film including breaking the fourth wall to explain to the audience about Singapore National Service. 
Sheikh Haikel as Johari Salleh, a large, chubby Malay boy who loves rap music. He wishes to be an actor so he can meet his favourite star, Malaysian actress and singer Deanna Yusoff. Some of funny moments about him are usually about his daydreams involving her and also, his weight.
Ahamed Azad as Krishnamoorthy, a heroic Indian boy who acts like a typical Bollywood hero. He has a positive attitude to joining NS to prove how much of a heroic man he is to his girlfriend Lathi. Yet at the same time, Krishna does not hesitate to break some rules to spend more time with her. His relationship is brought into question after an incident involving her and a superior.
Adrian Lim Meng Kiat as Teo Ah Beng, a mean, foul-mouthed Chinese teenager just like his namesake, Ah Beng. Has a severe dislike of having to serve National Service and is only doing it for the allowance. A recurring joke about Ah Beng is that everyone keeps telling him speak Mandarin when he speaks in Hokkien. Krishna quickly becomes friends with him due to the latter secretly carrying a cellphone and pager.
Kevin Mark Marghese as Kenny Pereira, an effeminate Eurasian youth. Most of the funny moments about him are usually about how he manages to "feminise" any situation he is in.
Margaret Chan as Mrs Png, Malcolm's mother. Mrs Png dotes on her son and expects Malcolm to get special treatment within the Army due to her husband working as a government official. However, she is unaware or does not realise that Malcolm will be treated the same like other recruits with no special privileges. As she does not understand the training and bonding he does in the army, she thinks her son is not eating enough and becoming stupid for spending time with the 'unintelligent' people.
Jacintha Charles as  Lathi, Krishna's girlfriend. She is madly in love with Krishna and thinks him heroic for joining the army. She remains faithful to Krishna, despite the flirting towards his superior.	
Eileen Wee Ling Yin as Teo Ah Huay, Ah Beng's younger sister. Ah Beng is sometimes annoyed about her due to the outlandish clothes she wears alongside the fact she keeps bugging him for money and family matters back home. 	
Daniel Gan Wei Teck as CPL Ong, the platoon's Drill instructor. He tends to act harsh whenever the recruits try to be funny. While giving military lessons, he is also known for quoting very strange Chinese sayings.
Rajagopal Kesavadas as SGT Monteiro, the Platoon Sergeant. He gets annoyed whenever the recruits do not act accordingly in what they are doing in the army. Despite so, he does have a sense of humour which the recruits fail to grasp.
Elaine Li Hoon Cheah as Sgt. Wendy Chung, the Sergeant in charge in bayonet combat. She is stern while in uniform and despises the recruits for not taking her lessons seriously. However, Ah Beng falls in love with her.
Julian Jay Huang as 2LT Collin Heng, the platoon's commander. A handsome man who acts gentlemanly and cares about the men under his command. He unknowingly introduced himself informally to Lathi after comforting her over Krishna's state, but is oblivious to the matter at hand.
Ong Chuen Boone as Mr X, a man who secretly sells Malcolm a book in the beginning in the movie called "101 Ways To Twang In The Army", a book that shows how recruits can skive off within the Singapore Army without getting in trouble, including how to become an Army Clerk. He however is no more than a swindler, as his methods are unsuccessfully tried by the recruits who get caught by their superiors.
 Deanna Yusoff as herself. A famous Malaysian actress and singer, she is Johari's crush. She appears in Johari's imaginations and in one segment with Malcolm about recruits having girlfriends. She also appears at the end of the film which reveals she was Sgt Wendy Chung's old school mate from Kuala Lumpur.
 Lim Kay Tong as Captain Lim, CPL Ong's superior who is easily impressed by the antics of his men.

Releases

Box office 
With a budget of S$700,000, Army Daze was one of the most profitable Singaporean films during that time, earning about S$1,600,000 at the local box office. The film's digital remaster received a limited re-release in March 2013.

Home media 
A 15th anniversary edition DVD of the film was released in August 2011.

References

External links
 	
Laugh -- That's an Order Asiaweek.com article

1996 films
1990s English-language films
Malay-language films
Hokkien-language films
1990s Mandarin-language films
1996 multilingual films
Singaporean multilingual films